The Vietnamese National Women's U-16 Football Championship (Vietnamese : Giải bóng đá Nữ v
Vô địch U16 Quốc gia) is annual football tournament held for women under age of 16 and organised by VFF
Current champion is U16 Reserve Team (Vietnamese : Dự tuyển U16 nữ Việt Nam) when they won the title in 2020

Champion

References

Women's football competitions in Vietnam
Under-16 association football
Football leagues in Vietnam